State Road 539 (NM 539) is a  state highway in the US state of New Mexico. NM 539's southern terminus is at U.S. Route 64 (US 64) in Navajo City, and the northern terminus is at NM 511 in Navajo Dam.

Major intersections

See also

References

539
Transportation in San Juan County, New Mexico
Transportation in Rio Arriba County, New Mexico